Hampea reynae, the majagua, is a species of flowering plant in the family Malvaceae. It is endemic to the cloud forests of El Salvador, and was first described in 1980 by Paul Fryxell.

References

reynae
Endemic flora of El Salvador
Taxonomy articles created by Polbot